Kaldar is a small district (population around 19,400) in the northern part of Balkh Province, Afghanistan. The northern and the eastern border of the district is the large Amu Darya river. North of the river is Uzbekistan and east is Tajikistan. The main village, also called Kaldar, is in the northeastern part of the district, close to the river. According to the inhabitants of this village, its original name is Kakoldar.

Demographics
According to the 2012-13 census, there are 19,400 people living in the village. 9,900 or 51.0% of borough residents were males and 9,500 or 49.0% were females. With a multi-ethnic and mostly Persian-speaking society. The major ethnic group is the Tajiks followed by significant amount of population being ethnic Pashtoons and later Uzbek, Hazaras, Turkman, Arab and Baluch. Kaldar also has a small but noticeable population of Kuchis or nomads whose numbers vary in different seasons with numbers going down in the winter and up in the summer.

References

Districts of Balkh Province